This is a list of Mongolian provinces by GDP and GDP per capita. The Mongolian tögrög has been converted to the international dollar using the IMF's Purchasing Power Parity conversion rate.

Provinces by GDP 
The following table is the list of the provinces of Mongolia by GDP in 2020 according to data by the National Statistics Office of Mongolia.

Provinces by GDP per capita 
The following table is the list of the provinces of Mongolia by GDP in 2020 according to data by the National Statistics Office of Mongolia.

See also 
 Provinces of Mongolia
 Economy of Mongolia

References 

provinces of Mongolia by GDP

GDP
Mongolia